Kairat Erdenovich "Kai" Metov (September 19, 1964, Karaganda, Kazakh SSR, USSR) is a Russian singer-songwriter and composer. Honored Artist of Russia (2015).

References

External links
 Official Website  

1964 births
Living people
People from Karaganda
21st-century Russian male singers
21st-century Russian singers
Russian male composers
Honored Artists of the Russian Federation
Russian pop musicians
20th-century Russian male singers
20th-century Russian singers
Russian Academy of Theatre Arts alumni
Russian State Social University alumni
Russian people of Kazakhstani descent